Charles Nyamiti (1931 – 2020) was a Catholic theologian known for his pioneer work in African theology.

Biography 
Nyamiti, a Wanyamwezi of Tanzania, was born in 1931 into a Christian home to Theophilus Chambi Chambigulu and Helen Nyasolo as one of three brothers and four sisters. He trained for the Catholic priesthood at Kipalapala Major Seminary in Tabora, Tanzania, and was ordained a Catholic priest in 1962. He went to Louvain University from 1963 to 1969, completing a doctorate in Systematic Theology and a certificate in Music Theory and Piano, and pursued a second doctorate in Cultural Anthropology and a Licentiate in Music Composition at the University of Vienna.

After his education, Nyamiti returned to Tanzania, serving as a professor at Kipalapala Major Seminary (1976—1981) and at the Catholic University of Eastern Africa (1983—2019) in Nairobi, Kenya.

After his time at the Catholic University of Eastern Africa, Namiti returned to the Archdiocese of Tabora and died on 19 May 2020.

Theology 
Nyamiti is known as a pioneer in African theology, drawing from a process of the inculturation to root Christian theology in both Thomistic and Bantu worldviews.

He is perhaps best known for his Ancestor Christology in his Christ as Our Ancestor (1984), where he speaks of Christ as "Brother-Ancestor."

Works

References 

1931 births
2020 deaths
World Christianity scholars
Tanzanian Roman Catholic priests
20th-century Roman Catholic theologians
21st-century Roman Catholic theologians